Tanaica maculata is a species of tephritid or fruit flies in the genus Tanaica of the family Tephritidae.

Distribution
Ethiopia, Kenya, Saudi Arabia.

References

Tephritinae
Insects described in 2005
Diptera of Africa
Diptera of Asia